Manuel "Manolo" Martínez Gutiérrez (born December 7, 1974) is a retired Spanish shot putter. Nicknamed the "Gentle Giant", his personal best throw outdoors is 21.47 metres and he has an indoor best of 21.26 m. These marks are the Spanish national records for the event. His international career lasted from 1992 to 2011 and he earned national selection on 84 occasions – the most by any Spanish athlete.

Born in León, Spain, he established himself as a junior athlete at the age of seventeen by winning the silver medal at the World Junior Championships and becoming the European Junior Champion the following year. His first major medals as a senior thrower came indoors when he won silver at the 2000 European Athletics Indoor Championships and then secured the bronze at the 2001 IAAF World Indoor Championships.

His career highlights also came indoors, as he won at the 2002 European Indoor Championships and went on to take the gold medal at the 2003 World Indoor Championships. He scored the bronze medal at the 2004 Athens Olympics in May 2013 following an IAAF drug test disqualified the first-place participant.

He represented Spain at the Olympics four times consecutively from 1996 to 2008, and also competed at five consecutive editions of the European Athletics Championships. He participated in the shot put at every World Championships in Athletics from 1993 to 2009, with the sole exception of the 1999 event.

In other competitions, he was a two-time gold medallist at the Mediterranean Games (2001 and 2009), including a Games record of 21.03 m, won gold at the 2001 Summer Universiade, and won three titles at the Ibero-American Championships. He was also the bronze medallist at the 2001 Goodwill Games, 2004 IAAF World Athletics Final, and 2005 European Indoor Championships.

Martínez improved Spanish national records on 31 occasions in his career. He won 16 consecutive outdoor national titles in the shot put from 1993 to 2008, and also won 15 indoor titles. He competed domestically for C.D. Universidad León Atletismo and was coached by Carlos Burón. Martínez retired from competitive athletics in April 2011.

Outside of shot putting, he is an artist and an actor. He starred in Estigmas, a film directed by Adán Aliaga and produced by Jaibo Films. The film is adapted from Lorenzo Mattotti's comic, Stigmate. He performed the role of Goliat in 2011 film El Capitán Trueno y el Santo Grial and the role of Tyson in the 2012 series La fuga.

International performances

References

Competition statistics
Manuel Martínez biografía. Real Federación Española de Atletismo (RFEA). Retrieved on 2011-04-30.

External links
 

1974 births
Living people
Sportspeople from León, Spain
Spanish male shot putters
Athletes (track and field) at the 1996 Summer Olympics
Athletes (track and field) at the 2000 Summer Olympics
Athletes (track and field) at the 2004 Summer Olympics
Athletes (track and field) at the 2008 Summer Olympics
Olympic athletes of Spain
Medalists at the 2004 Summer Olympics
Olympic bronze medalists for Spain
Mediterranean Games gold medalists for Spain
Mediterranean Games silver medalists for Spain
Athletes (track and field) at the 2001 Mediterranean Games
Athletes (track and field) at the 2005 Mediterranean Games
Athletes (track and field) at the 2009 Mediterranean Games
Universiade medalists in athletics (track and field)
Goodwill Games medalists in athletics
Mediterranean Games medalists in athletics
Universiade gold medalists for Spain
World Athletics Indoor Championships winners
Medalists at the 2001 Summer Universiade
Competitors at the 2001 Goodwill Games